Narayana Padaiyatchi Ratnam (c. 1897 – August 1950), popularly known as "Kali" N. Ratnam, was a Tamil stage and film artist known for his roles as a comedian in Tamil movies of the 1930s and 1940s. Renowned Tamil actor and politician M. G. Ramachandran was a protege of Rathnam.

Early life 

Rathnam was born at Malaiyappanallur near Kumbakonam in Tanjore District in the year 1897 to Narayana Padayatchi and Thangathammal. His parents were agriculturists and Rathanm was acquainted with rural songs and folk arts from a very early age. As a young boy, Rathnam learned to act from a stage actor named Parameswaran Iyer. Seeing Rathnam perform the role of Kali in a stage play, Iyer christened him "Kali" N. Rathnam.

Career 
Rathnam joined the Madurai Original Boys Company in 1923 and acted in Pathi Bhakthi (1936), the first movie produced by the Company. Rathnam's second movie was Mannarswami (1936). But Rathnam's first hit was Chandrakantha (1936). Following the success, Rathnam acted in hit movies such as Uthama Puthiran, Sathi Murali (1940), Sabapathy (1941), Manonmani (1943), Burma Rani (1945), Chow Chow (1945), Paranjothi (1945), Sri Murugan (1946), Arthanari (1946), Aaravalli (1946), Sahada Yogam (1946), Udayanan Vasavadatta (1947), Kannika (1947), Sulochana (1947), Sri Aandal (1948), Adhithan Kanavu (1948), Devdasi (1948), Pizhaikum Vali (1948), and Bhojan (1948).

Personal life 

While in a drama tour of Coimbatore, Rathnam was impressed by the histrionic skills of C. T. Rajakantham, daughter of the owner of the house in which they stayed and inducted her into his troupe. The two became a successful comedy pair and acted together in a number of movies.

Prior to this, Rathnam had married twice. The first wife's name was Kunjammal who died at a young age. Rathnam and Kunjammal had two daughters Meenalochani and Lokanayaki(late). Then he married his second wife Pichaimmal(late). Rathnam and Pichaimmal had a son Shanmuga Sundaram(Retd PWD Superindent Engineer). Rathnam died when his son was nine months old. Shanmuga Sundaram married Chandra, daughter of his sister Meenalochani RajaRam. Now(2020) Meenalochani RajaRam, Shanmuga Sundaram and Chandra are living in Kumbakonam.

Death 

Rathnam died in August 1950 at the age of 52 or 53. His last completed film role was in the Ellis R. Dungan-directed Ponmudi.

Filmography 
This is a partial filmography. You can expand it.

References

External links 
 

1890s births
1950 deaths
Tamil actors
Tamil comedians
Indian comedians
Indian male actors
Tamil male actors